The nickname Tarzan may refer to:

 Enrico Annoni (born 1966), Italian retired footballer
 Tom Beer (born 1944), American former National Football League player
 Migueli (born Miguel Bernardo Bianquetti in 1951), Spanish retired footballer 
 Gilles Bilodeau (1955-2008), Canadian ice hockey player, mainly in the World Hockey Association
 Don Bragg (1935-2019), American retired pole vaulter
 Ellison Brown (1914–1975), Narragansett Indian runner
 Younus Changezi (born 1944), Pakistani politician
 Tarzan Cooper (1907-1980), African-American basketball player
 Cyrille Delannoit (1926-1998), European middleweight boxing champion in 1948
 John F. Druze (1914-2005), American football player and college football coach
 Bobby Estalella (outfielder) (1911-1991), Major League Baseball player
 Ludwig Fainberg (born 1958), Ukrainian mobster
 Brendon Gale (born 1968),  Australian rules football sports administrator and former player
 Eric Glass (1910-1985), Australian rules footballer
 Michael Heseltine (born 1933), Welsh-British politician and businessman
 Carl Holtz (1920-2006), American rower
 Joe Kendall (1909-1965), African-American member of the College Football Hall of Fame
 Mohamed Nur, Somali politician, mayor of Mogadishu (2010-2014)
 Roberto Olivo (1914–2005), Venezuelan baseball umpire
 David "Tarzan" Ritchie (born 1945), Scottish former shinty player
 Antonio Roma (1932–2013), Argentine football goalkeeper
 Hector Tarrazona (born 1944), former Philippine Air Force colonel and a founding member of the Reform the Armed Forces Movement
 Tarzan Taylor (1895-1971), American football player
 David Tyrrell (rugby league) (born 1988), Australian rugby league player
 Joe Wallis (born 1952), American retired Major League Baseball player
 Art White (1915-1996), American National Football League player
 Tarzan Woltzen (1905–1995), American professional basketball player
 Tarzan Yamada (born 1962), Japanese race car driver

See also
 Laurent Dauthuille (1924-1971), French boxer nicknamed the "Tarzan of Buzenval"
 Earl Durand (1913–1939), American poacher, jail escapee and killer nicknamed the "Tarzan of the Tetons"
 Mike Massey (born 1947), American pocket billiards player and trick-shot artist nicknamed "Tennessee Tarzan"

Lists of people by nickname